Mr. Soul is an album by jazz pianist John Wright which was recorded in 1962 and released on the Prestige label.

Track listing 
All compositions by John Wright, except where indicated.
 "Our Waltz" (David Rose, Nat Burton) – 5:21
 "Blue Prelude" (Gordon Jenkins, Joe Bishop) – 3:25	
 "What's New?" (Bob Haggart, Johnny Burke) – 5:29	
 "Everything's Gonna Work Out Fine" – 3:24
 "Mr. Soul" (Esmond Edwards) – 5:32	
 "Shake" – 2:31	
 "Strut" – 5:16	
 "Now Hang in There" – 4:03

Personnel

Performers
John Wright - piano
Wendell Marshall  - bass
Walter Perkins - drums

Production
 Esmond Edwards – supervision
 Rudy Van Gelder – engineer

References 

1962 albums
John Wright (pianist) albums
Prestige Records albums
Albums recorded at Van Gelder Studio
Albums produced by Esmond Edwards